L. Clifford Davis (born October 12, 1924) is an attorney from Wilton, Arkansas, whose unsuccessful efforts for admission to the University of Arkansas Law School resulted in the eventual admission of African-American students to the school. He also served over thirty years as an attorney and judge, and assisted Thurgood Marshall in the case that became Brown v Board.

History
Davis was born in Wilton. Since the town's educational opportunities for black students ended in the eight grade, Clifton attended high school at Dunbar High School in Little Rock. He graduated from Philander Smith College in 1945. The state paid tuition for Davis to attend a school out of state to avoid having him in a classroom with white students, but when Davis realized the higher cost of living at Howard University in Washington, D.C. far outweighed the cost of tuition, he insisted on applying to U of A. In 1947, after applying to the University of Arkansas Law School for two years, he was granted admission under the circumstance that he would not be allowed to enter a room with white students in it, including classrooms, the library and the restrooms. Davis instead completed his law degree at Howard University in 1949 and then returned to Arkansas. He passed the bar and set up a practice in Pine Bluff, Arkansas. In 1952 he moved to Waco, Texas to teach at Paul Quinn College. He took and passed the bar in Texas and in 1954 became one of only two black lawyers in Fort Worth, Texas. In 1956, he filed a federal lawsuit which resulted in a court order for integration of the public schools in Mansfield, Texas, although the threat of violence from white students kept those schools segregated for some time. In 1959, in Flax v. Potts, he won a suit forcing the Fort Worth schools to integrate. He organized the Fort Worth Black Bar Association in 1977. In 1983, Governor Mark White appointed him to a judgeship in criminal district court. He continued to serve as a judge until he lost an election in 1988, then continued as a visiting judge until 2004.

Awards and Recognition have included the NAACP’s William Robert Ming Award, the Blackstone Award (the highest honor given by the Tarrant County Bar Association), the National Bar Association Hall of Fame, and a Lifetime Achievement award from Texas Lawyer. An elementary school in Fort Worth, Texas, bears his name. In 2017, at age 92, the University of Arkansas School of Law granted him an honorary doctorate, in place of the one he was denied in 1949.

References 

Philander Smith College alumni
Paul Quinn College
Pine Bluff, Arkansas
Howard University alumni
1924 births
Living people
National Bar Association
Activists for African-American civil rights
African-American lawyers
School desegregation pioneers